The 2019–2020 Bryant Bulldogs men's basketball team represented Bryant University during the 2019–20 NCAA Division I men's basketball season. The Bulldogs were led by second-year head coach Jared Grasso, and played their home games at the Chace Athletic Center in Smithfield, Rhode Island as members of the Northeast Conference. They finished the season 15–17, 7–11 in NEC play to finish in a three-way tie for seventh place. They lost in the quarterfinals of the NEC tournament to Saint Francis (PA).

Previous season 
The Bulldogs finished the 2018–19 season 10–20, 7–11 in NEC play to finish in eight place. As the No. 8 seed in the NEC tournament, they lost in the quarterfinals to Saint Francis (PA).

Roster

Schedule and results

|-
!colspan=9 style=| Non-conference regular season

|-
!colspan=9 style=| Northeast Conference regular season    

   

   

|-
!colspan=9 style=| NEC tournament

|-

Schedule source:

References

Bryant Bulldogs men's basketball seasons
Bryant
Bryant
Bryant